Solanum apical leaf curl virus (SALCV) is a proposed species of plant pathogenic virus of the family Geminiviridae.

References

External links
ICTVdB - The Universal Virus Database: Solanum apical leaf curling virus

Begomovirus
Viral plant pathogens and diseases
Unaccepted virus taxa